Tilak Nagar Assembly constituency is one of the 70 Delhi Legislative Assembly constituencies of the National Capital Territory in northern India.

Overview
Present geographical structure of Tilak Nagar constituency came into existence in 2008 as a part of the implementation of the recommendations of the Delimitation Commission of India constituted in 2002.
Tilak Nagar is part of West Delhi Lok Sabha constituency along with nine other Assembly segments, namely, Madipur, Rajouri Garden, Hari Nagar, Najafgarh, Janakpuri, Vikaspuri, Dwarka, Matiala and Uttam Nagar.

Members of Legislative Assembly

Election results

2020

2015

2013

2008

2003

1998

1993

See also
 Tilak Nagar

References

Assembly constituencies of Delhi
Delhi Legislative Assembly
Memorials to Bal Gangadhar Tilak